Tin Pe was mayor of Yangon, Burma, from 1985 to 1986. He was also a founding member of the Union Revolutionary Council from 2 March 1962 until his resignation in 1970. Tin Pe was married to Tan Yu Sai's sister, Thein Saing.

References

Mayors of Yangon
Burmese military personnel
Living people
Defence Services Academy alumni
Year of birth missing (living people)